Blind Musician is a 1960 Soviet drama film directed by Tatyana Lukashevich.

Plot 
A blind boy who grew up in a quiet farmstead begins to know the world by touch, and one day his fingers find the keys of the piano. But, not yet knowing the value of his talent, he leaves with the tramps to  search for the truth. And now only love can reconcile him with the world of the sighted.

Cast 
 Boris Livanov as Uncle Maxim Yatsenko
 Vasily Livanov  as Pyotr
 Marina Strizhenova as Anna Mikhajlovna
  Larisa Kurdymova  as Evelina
  Yury Puzyryov  as Joachim
 Alexey Gribov as Fyodor Kaniba
 Sergei Blinnikov as Stavruchenko
  Viktor Nurganov  as Ilya

Release 
Tatyana Lukashevich's film occupies the 814th place in the overall rating of Soviet film distribution with 21.9 million viewers.

References

External links 
 

1960 films
1960s Russian-language films
Soviet drama films
1960 drama films
Mosfilm films
Films based on Russian novels
Films about blind people